Starmera is a genus of fungi within the Saccharomycetales order. It is placed within the Phaffomycetaceae family.

Starmera is often associated with necrotic lesions in cacti.

The genus was circumscribed by Yuzo Yamada, Tetsuo Higashi, Susumu Ando and Kozaburo Mikata in Bull. Fac. Agric. Shizuoka Univ. vol.47 on page 31 in 1997.

The genus name of Starmera is in honour of William Thomas Starmer (b.1944), an American botanist and emeritus professor of biology in the College of Arts and Sciences at Syracuse University.

Species
As accepted by Species Fungorum;
 Starmera amethionina 
 SStarmera caribaea 
 SStarmera dryadoides 
 SStarmera foglemanii 
 SStarmera ilhagrandensis 
 SStarmera pachycereana 
 SStarmera pilosocereana 
 SStarmera quercuum 
 SStarmera stellimalicola

References

External links 
 Starmera at Index Fungorum

Saccharomycetes